David Nganga Kamau (born August 4, 1965, in Nakuru, Kenya) is a former Kenyan professional boxer in the Light Middleweight division who lost only four times in 34 fights.

Amateur career
Kamau represented Kenya at the 1988 Summer Olympics in the light-welterweight category, losing his third fight to Sodnomdarjaagiin Altansükh of Mongolia. Previously in the competition, Kamau defeated Abidnasir Shahab of Jordan and Martin Ndongo-Ebanga of Cameroon.

Pro career
He was once trained by Alberto Davila, the former bantamweight champion of the world.

WBC Light Welterweight Championship
The undefeated African lost his first shot at the title to three-division World Champion, Mexican Julio César Chávez.

WBC Welterweight Championship
In his second effort at a World Championship he would not fare better, getting knocked out by four division World Champion, Mexican-American Oscar De La Hoya. In February 1999, he lost to American Danny Perez Ramírez.

WBO NABO Welterweight Championship
On June 16, 2000, Kamau lost to three-time world champion, American Antonio Margarito in Fantasy Springs Casino, Indio, California.

References

External links

 Sodnomdarjaagiin Altansükh versus David Kamau 1988

Light-middleweight boxers
1965 births
Living people
Kenyan male boxers
Olympic boxers of Kenya
Boxers at the 1988 Summer Olympics
African Games gold medalists for Kenya
African Games medalists in boxing
Competitors at the 1987 All-Africa Games